HMS Sibyl was a 28-gun  sixth-rate frigate of the Royal Navy.  Sibyl was renamed HMS Garland in 1795.

Service history

Sibyl was first commissioned in October 1778 under the command of Captain Thomas Pasley.

In February 1781 Sybil was part of a three ship fleet that gave chase to a 30 ship Dutch convoy, laden with valuable supplies, under escort by Admiral Krull that had departed from Sint Eustatius, a neutral port in the West Indies. The fleet intercepted the convoy and after a brief battle, Krull was mortally wounded where his flag ship surrendered to Reynolds.

An inconclusive engagement developed between Sibyl and Alliance that proved to be the last battle of the American Revolutionary War. Alarm and Tobago neither participated in the engagement nor captured Duc de Lauzun.

Sibyl was renamed HMS Garland in 1795.

Loss
In February 1798 Captain J. C. Searle sailed Garland for the Cape of Good Hope. There Captain James Athol Wood replaced him.

Wood received information that a large French ship was anchored off Port Dauphiné, Madagascar. He sailed Garland to investigate but as she approached the vessel on 26 July 1798, Garland struck a rock and sank before she could be run onshore. Still, the crew was able to take to the boats. Wood then decided to capture the French ship, which turned out to be a merchantman armed with 24 guns and carrying a crew of 150 men. The French crew had run their ship ashore at Garlands approach and abandoned her. However, when they saw Garland run ashore, they tried to retrieve their own vessel. Wood and his boats had the wind and reached the merchantman first. Wood was able to convince the natives to hand most of the Frenchmen over to the British. It was five months before the sloop-of-war  arrived to rescue Wood, his crew, and his prisoners-of-war. Star took the prisoners to Île de France. Wood and his men returned to the Cape Colony in their prize, a small boat of 15 tons burthen that they had built, and some small vessels that were prizes to the Cape squadron.

Wood returned to England, where on 15 December 1798 he and his officers were acquitted at the court martial for the loss of their ship.

Citations

References 
 Robert Gardiner, The First Frigates, Conway Maritime Press, London 1992. .
 
 David Lyon, The Sailing Navy List, Conway Maritime Press, London 1993. .
 
 
 Rif Winfield, British Warships in the Age of Sail, 1714 to 1792, Seaforth Publishing, London 2007. .

External links
 

1779 ships
Sixth-rate frigates of the Royal Navy
Maritime incidents in 1798
Ships built on the Beaulieu River
Shipwrecks in the Indian Ocean